Raghuvinder Kataria (born April 1949) is a Dubai-based British billionaire businessman, active in the property and telecommunications sectors.

Early life 
Raghuvinder Kataria was born in April 1949 in a Sikh household, and grew up in Jinja, Uganda.

At the age of 16, he moved to London, UK, taking a qualification to become an accountant.

Career 
He initially worked for International Computers Limited, becoming the company's European treasurer.

He later led the formation of Thai telecoms operator Jasmine Telecom, which merged with Bharti Enterprises.

He sold a stake in Bharti Airtel at the stock's peak in a transaction estimated to be valued at $500 million.

He is currently Chairman of Kataria Holdings.

Personal life 
Kataria is married to Shital Kataria, with two children and lives in Emirates Hills, Dubai, United Arab Emirates.

References

Living people
1949 births
British billionaires